Dead Leaves is a 2004 Japanese animated science fiction film produced by Manga Entertainment and Production I.G and directed by Hiroyuki Imaishi. It was distributed in Japan by Shochiku, in North America, Canada and the U.K. by Manga Entertainment, and in Australia and New Zealand by Madman Entertainment. The film is notable for its fast pace and energetic visual style.

Plot

Retro and Pandy, two unlikely renegades, awaken naked on Earth with no recollection of their past, but with superior physical abilities. After embarking on a brief but devastating crime spree for food, clothing and transportation in downtown Tokyo, they are captured by authorities and sent to the infamous prison called Dead Leaves, on the half-destroyed Moon.

Once incarcerated, Retro and Pandy are subjected to the activities taking place inside the prison facility, such as forced labor, straitjackets and mandatory defecation. During one such time, Retro meets Dick Drill, an inmate with a drill for a penis. 666 and 777, the super-powered prison guards, demonstrate their power when 777 flicks an inmate in the face, killing him along with everybody else behind him.

Back in their cell, Retro and Pandy orchestrate a mass prison break and discover the secret work being carried out at the facility. Over the course of the film, it is discovered that Pandy and Retro were spies working at the facility and the crazed warden is trying to get revenge on Pandy by re-creating a deranged fairy tale she remembers from her childhood.

In the finale, Pandy has Retro's child, who comes out with twin machine guns and blows the warden away. A giant caterpillar (part of the demented fairy tale) begins consuming the station until the mutant baby sacrifices himself so that his two parents can live. The film ends with Pandy and Retro crashing in the middle of Earth's dystopian metropolis in their escape pod, crushing a previously-victimized bystander and presumably restarting the events from the beginning of the film.

Characters

Main characters

Retro has no real memory of his former life, but doesn't seem to really care. He is convinced that he was either a Yakuza gang member or a ninja hit man, due in large measure to his considerable martial skills and his innate ability to wreak havoc with all manner of weapons. Because of his Yakuza-like behavior, Retro is very impulsive and violent, which usually gets those around him killed.
Retro has a TV for a head; his original human appearance is shown only in Pandy's flashbacks, having a mop of hair that covers his eyes, akin to Shermie.

The heroine, Pandy (so-called because of her panda-like mutated mark), seems to have some special connection with the prison governor, Galactica. Though ignorant of her past, something about her mutated eye causes her to experience bizarre flashbacks and strange, debilitating precognitive episodes. She is very strong at hand-to-hand combat and excellent at using fire arms. Though often annoyed by Retro's antics she does show that she cares for him, like when she angrily attacked Galactica for ripping off Retro's head.
Offspring

The result of Retro and Pandy having sex in prison, their child is born near the end of the story. Being Pandy's child he too has a mutant gene cluster which gives him extraordinary powers and causes his eyes to be different colors, like hers. Though only being alive for a few minutes, and already having aged from baby to old man, he shows he cares for his parents by sacrificing himself to save their lives. The first and only word he says is "papa", which he says when he takes one last look at Retro.

Prison workers

The mysterious and tyrannical warden of Dead Leaves prison. Galactica is in charge of the cloning and genetic engineering experiments that have created an unholy menagerie of deformed and infinitely expendable inmates. Something of a cyborg, Galactica has an arsenal of weapons and sinister devices at her disposal built into her body. She actually doesn't do much per se, save for goading Pandy and finally succeeding when she decapitates Retro (who survives despite the lack of a body, a trait shared by 666 and 777).

Product of the Dead Leaves bio-weapons experiments, 666 (three-six, or referred to as "Triple Six" in the English dub) is a tall, skinny character who moves at high velocity when confronted with a challenge. His primary weapons are two long blades attached to his arms.

777 (three-seven, or referred to as "Triple Seven" in the English dub) is also a product of the Dead Leaves experiments and the bulky, powerful counterpart of 666. Says a quick prayer before going into battle, something 666 admonishes him for, stating it's a little late for that. Tends to prefer his brute strength and a wide assortment of guns he has at his disposal within his body.

Inmates

An easily identifiable character with a drill for his penis, similar to the main character from the film Tetsuo: The Iron Man. He is one of the most helpful and loyal followers picked up by Retro and Pandy during their attempted escape, and seems to be sexually attracted to Retro. Later brutally killed by 777 while trying to defend Retro from him.

A curiously knowledgeable inmate when it comes to prison affairs. He too aids in the jail break. He used to be a doctor, but was sent to Dead Leaves when one of his patients died. Later gets cut into paste by 666.

Appears later in the movie, and takes command of the tank stolen from the Armoury. He seems to be a leader of sorts as the other prisoners attempt to avenge his death.

External links
Dead Leaves page on Production I.G website

2004 anime films
2000s action comedy films
2004 science fiction action films
Japanese action comedy films
Adventure anime and manga
Animated comedy films
Anime with original screenplays
Comedy anime and manga
2000s science fiction comedy films
Japanese science fiction comedy films
Japanese animated science fiction films
2000s Japanese-language films
Manga Entertainment
Production I.G
Prisons in anime and manga
Japanese science fiction action films
2004 comedy films
2004 films
Films scored by Yoshihiro Ike
Films directed by Hiroyuki Imaishi